Centennial Public School is a school district consisting of a single school in unincorporated Seward County, Nebraska, adjacent to Utica, consisting of a single school. It includes grades K-12.

Tim DeWaard became superintendent on July 1, 2007. In July 2020 DeWaard resigned with all board members approving his resignation. Virginia Moon serves as interim superintendent. As per his December 2020 selection, Seth Ford will become superintendent effective July 1, 2021.

References

External links
 Centennial Public School
 Centennial Public School - Performing Arts Auditorium - Cheever Construction
School districts in Nebraska
Education in Seward County, Nebraska